Royal Neighbors of America is a Life insurance company targeted towards women.

History 

In 1888, Marie Kirkland of Council Bluffs, IA placed a notice in her town newspaper asking the wives of Modern Woodmen of America members to meet for a social get-together. Eight women responded and organized what was to become Royal Neighbors of America. A year later, the group reorganized as a social organization with a constitution, ritual, and articles of incorporation. The name Royal Neighbors of America was chosen by the women because they adhered to the verse “For better is a neighbor that is near than a brother that is far.”
	
Later, the idea of incorporating it as a fraternal benefit society was discussed. In 1894, it was decided to incorporate in the State of Illinois. Royal Neighbors was chartered as a fraternal benefit society on March 21, 1895. The first home office was located in Peoria, IL, and was moved to Rock Island, IL in 1908.

In 1931 the society opened the Royal Neighbors of America National Home on the west side of Davenport, Iowa. It was intended to help women in their organization who were in need of assistance. It was closed in 2004, with the property being sold in 2006. The facility was listed on the National Register of Historic Places in 2015.

References

External links 
Official website

Organizations established in 1895
Woodmen of the World
Women's organizations based in the United States
Companies based in Rock Island County, Illinois
1895 establishments in the United States